Carbohydrate sulfotransferase 11 is an enzyme that in humans is encoded by the CHST11 gene.

Clinical relevance 

Mutations in this gene have been associated to susceptibility for osteoarthritis.

Model organisms
Model organisms have been used in the study of CHST11 function. A conditional knockout mouse line called Chst11tm1a(KOMP)Wtsi was generated at the Wellcome Trust Sanger Institute. Male and female animals underwent a standardized phenotypic screen to determine the effects of deletion. Additional screens performed:  - In-depth immunological phenotyping - in-depth bone and cartilage phenotyping

References

External links

Further reading